Fukami is a Japanese surname. Notable people with the surname include:

, Japanese writer
, Japanese voice actress
, Japanese sculptor
Tadashi Fukami, Japanese professor